Ludwig von Flotow, after 1919 known simply as Ludwig Flotow (17 November 1867 in Vienna - 6 April 1948 in Gmunden) was an Austro-Hungarian statesman. He was the last Chairman of the Ministers' Council for Common Affairs, having served from 2 November 1918 until 11 November 1918. He resigned his office only in 1920, being loyal to Emperor Charles I of Austria.

References 

1867 births
1948 deaths